La Queue-en-Brie (literally La Queue in Brie) is a commune in the southeastern suburbs of Paris, France.

History
On 7 July 1899, a part of the territory of La Queue-en-Brie was detached and merged with a part of the territory of Chennevières-sur-Marne and a part of the territory of Villiers-sur-Marne to create the commune of Le Plessis-Trévise.

Population

Transport
La Queue-en-Brie is served by no station of the Paris Métro, RER, or suburban rail network. The closest station to La Queue-en-Brie is Émerainville – Pontault-Combault station on Paris RER line E. This station is located in the neighboring commune of Pontault-Combault,  from the town center of La Queue-en-Brie.

Education
The commune has five groups of primary schools (each having preschools/nurseries (maternelles) and elementary schools), with a combined total of 1,500 students. There are four preschools and five elementary schools. The school groups Pauline Kergomard, Jean Zay, and Lamartine each have a preschool and elementary. Gournay is preschool only, while Pasteur and Jean Jaures are elementary only.

Collège Jean Moulin serves as the communal junior high school. Senior high/sixth-form students are served by Lycée Champlain in Chennevières-sur-Marne.

See also
Communes of the Val-de-Marne department

References

External links

 La Queue-en-Brie 

Communes of Val-de-Marne